Sokna is a small village located between Hønefoss and Krøderen in the municipality of Ringerike, in the county of Buskerud, Norway. Its population is 543.

Location
Sokna is located in the valley  of Soknedalen,  between the Sogna and  Verkenselva  rivers. Sogna is a small river that starts at the end of  Lake Sognevannet in Strømsoddbygda at the top of the valley of Sokndalen and  empties into Tyrifjorden. The Verkenselva flows into the Sogna just southeast of Sokna. Norwegian National Road 7 (RV 7) runs through the village, as does the Bergen Line which extends between Hønefoss and Hallingdal, although rail trains no longer stop at Sokna.<ref>[http://www.nina.no/archive/nina/PppBasePdf/rapport/2006/114.pdf Mapping the rivers Margaritifera in Rudselva and  Verkenselva in Soknavassdraget(Norwegian Institute for Nature Research)]</ref>

Sokna is situated close to large open forested areas  including  Holleia, Brekkebygda and Strømsoddbygda as well as the Ådalsfjella mountain range. It is also not far to Hønefoss (around 23 km) and Norefjell (around 32 km).

Etymology
The name of Sokna originated with the Old Norse word  Sókn meaning parish.

Lunder Church

Lunder Church (Lunder kirke)  situated at the village Sokna is the church of Lunder parish. It is a cruciform church, with an exterior clad with staff panel. Lunder Church dates to 1706 when it was consecrated a new church which was called Our Savior Church. The church was moved to where it now lies at the end of 1750. Renovation and reconstruction took place in 1761. Since then the church has been restored several times, including in the 1880 (architect: Henrik Nissen) and in 1922-1924 (architect:Ole Stein). 

Strømsoddbygde Chapel (Strømsoddbygda kapell'') is located in the forested area of Strømsoddbygda, approx. 15 km north of Sokna.  The church was designed by architect Oddmund Eindride Slaatto (1896-1963) and was built of lumber in 1953.  Strømsoddbygda Chapel is an annex of Lunder Church. Both churched  belongs under the Norderhov parish, with Norderhov Church as the main church. These churches all belong to the Diocese of Tunsberg.

Gallery

References

External links
 History of Lunder church

Villages in Buskerud